Yerevan Children's Railway is a narrow gauge railroad loop passing through the Hrazdan gorge in Yerevan, Armenia. One of many children's railways that existed in the USSR and continued functioning after its breakup in post-Soviet states, it was opened on June 9, 1937.  Master plan and old wood building were designed by architect Mikael Mazmanyan in 1937. The current main Station was designed and built by architect Babken Sedrak Hakobyan in the late 1940s.

External links

 Детская железная дорога
 Ереван. Детская железная дорога

Buildings and structures completed in 1937
Transport in Armenia
Rail transport in Armenia
Children's railways
Buildings and structures built in the Soviet Union
Rail transport in the Soviet Union
750 mm gauge railways in Armenia